Poland competed at the 1968 Summer Olympics in Mexico City, Mexico. 177 competitors, 140 men and 37 women, took part in 112 events in 16 sports.

Medalists

Gold 
 Irena Szewińska — Athletics, Women's 200 metres
 Jerzy Kulej — Boxing, Men's Light Welterweight
 Jerzy Pawłowski — Fencing, Men's Sabre Individual
 Józef Zapędzki — Shooting, Men's Rapid-Fire Pistol
 Waldemar Baszanowski — Weightlifting, Men's Lightweight

Silver 
 Artur Olech — Boxing, Men's Flyweight
 Józef Grudzień — Boxing, Men's Lightweight

Bronze 
 Irena Szewińska — Athletics, Women's 100 metres
 Hubert Skrzypczak — Boxing, Men's Light Flyweight
 Stanisław Dragan — Boxing, Men's Light Heavyweight
 Janusz Kierzkowski — Cycling, Men's 1000m Time Trial
 Zbigniew Skrudlik, Witold Woyda, Egon Franke, Adam Lisewski, and Ryszard Parulski — Fencing, Men's Foil Team Competition
 Henryk Nielaba, Bohdan Gonsior, Michał Butkiewicz, Bohdan Andrzejewski, and Kazimierz Barburski — Fencing, Men's Épée Team Competition
 Elżbieta Porzec, Zofia Szczęśniewska,  Wanda Wiecha, Barbara Hermela-Niemczyk, Krystyna Ostromęcka, Krystyna Krupa, Jadwiga Książęk, Józefa Ledwig, Krystyna Jakubowska, Lidia Chmielnicka, Krystyna Czajkowska, and Halina Aszkiełowicz — Volleyball, Women's Team Competition
 Henryk Trębicki — Weightlifting, Men's Bantamweight
 Marian Zieliński — Weightlifting, Men's Lightweight
 Norbert Ozimek — Weightlifting, Men's Light Heavyweight
 Marek Gołąb — Weightlifting, Men's Middle Heavyweight

Athletics

Men
Track & road events

Field events

Women
Track & road events

Field events

Basketball

Preliminary round

Group B

13 October

14 October

15 October

16 October

18 October

19 October

20 October

19 October

20 October

Classification brackets

5th–8th Place
22 October

5th-6th Place
25 October

Boxing

Men

Canoeing

Sprint
Men

Women

Cycling

Ten cyclists represented Poland in 1968.

Road

Track
1000m time trial

Pursuit

Diving

Men

Women

Equestrian

Show jumping

Fencing

20 fencers, 15 men and 5 women, represented Poland in 1968.

Men

Women

Gymnastics

Artistic
Men

Women

Rowing

Men

Sailing

Open

Shooting

Eleven shooters, ten men and one woman, represented Poland in 1968. Józef Zapędzki won gold in the 25 metre pistol.
Open

Swimming

Men

Volleyball

Women's team competition
Round robin

Roster
 Bronze Medal

 Elżbieta Porzec
 Zofia Szczęśniewska
 Wanda Wiecha
 Barbara Hermela-Niemczyk

 Krystyna Ostromęcka
 Krystyna Krupa
 Jadwiga Książek
 Józefa Ledwig

 Krystyna Jakubowska
 Lidia Chmielnicka
 Krystyna Czajkowska
 Halina Aszkiełowicz

Head coach

Weightlifting

Men

Wrestling

Men's freestyle

Men's Greco-Roman

References

External links
Official Olympic Reports
International Olympic Committee results database

Nations at the 1968 Summer Olympics
1968
1968 in Polish sport